Erigeron tenellus is a North American species of flowering plant in the family Asteraceae known by the common name Río Grande fleabane. It is native to the valley of the Río Grande, on both sides of the international border. It is found in the US state of Texas as well as in Nuevo León and Tamaulipas in México.

Erigeron tenellus grows in brushlands and in open woodlands dominated by palms. It is an annual herb up to 40 centimeters (16 inches) tall, producing a narrow taproot. The inflorescence is made up of 1-20 flower heads per stem, in a loose array. Each head contains 95–250 blue or white ray florets surrounding numerous yellow disc florets.

References

External links
Jepson Manual Treatment
United States Department of AgriculturePlants Profile
Calphotos Photo gallery, University of California

tenellus
Flora of Northeastern Mexico
Flora of Texas
Plants described in 1836